Artem Dalakian (born 10 August 1987) is a Ukrainian professional boxer who has held the WBA flyweight title since 2018. As of June 2022, he is ranked as the world's fourth best active flyweight by The Ring and the Transnational Boxing Rankings Board, and third by BoxRec.

Professional career

Early career
Dalakian was scheduled to fight Angel Moreno for the vacant WBA Continental flyweight title, on July 17, 2015. He won the fight by a unanimous decision.

Dalakian was scheduled to make his first title defense against Robert Kanalas, on December 5, 2015. He beat Kanalas by a first-round technical knockout, stopping his opponent at the 2:24 minute mark.

Dalakian defended his title for the second time against the 2013 EBU Flyweight champion Silviu Olteanu, on May 14, 2016. Dalakian won the fight by an eight-round technical knockout.

Dalakian fought Jozsef Ajtai in his third title defense, on November 6, 2016. He beat Ajtai by a third-round technical knockout.

Dalaian was scheduled to make his fourth and final WBA Continental title defense against Luis Manuel Macias, on April 22, 2017. He beat Macias by a sixth-round knockout.

WBA flyweight champion

Dalakian vs. Viloria 
Dalakian was scheduled to fight the former unified WBA and WBO flyweight champion Brian Viloria on February 24, 2018, for the vacant WBA flyweight title. The fight was scheduled as a part of the "Superfly 2" card, which was the second of a series of professional boxing cards centered around the super flyweight division. Viloria was the more experienced of the two, having fought in fourteen world title fights, while Dalakian was making his first world title challenge. Dalakian won the fight by a dominant unanimous decision, with all three judges scoring the fight scoring the fight 118-109 for Dalakian. The referee took away a point from Dalakian in the ninth round for repeatedly pushing Viloria down. Dalakian kept distance from Viloria throughout the twelve, managing to stagger his opponent in both the second and ninth rounds, although he was unable to finish him.

Dalakian vs. Thaiyen 
Dalakian was scheduled make his first title defense against Sirichai Thaiyen on June 17, 2018. Thaiyen was, at the time, the #1 rated contender in the WBA flyweight rankings and Dalakian’s mandatory challenger. Dalakian was completely dominant, knocking Thaiyen down in rounds five, six and eight, with the referee stopping the fight after the third knockdown.

Dalakian vs. Lebron 
It was announced on October 16, 2018, that Dalakian would make a voluntary defense in December. The rumored opponents included Dennepa Kaitniwat, Gregorio Lebron and an unknown Japanese opponent. Dalakian later revealed he would make his second title defense against Gregorio Lebron on December 15, 2018. Lebron was ranked #3 at flyweight by the WBA. Dalakian won the fight by technical knockout, managing to knock Lebron down three times in the sixth round.

Dalakian vs. Thawornkham 
Dalakian was scheduled to make his third title defense against the #1 ranked WBA flyweight and the WBA mandatory Sarawut Thawornkham, on June 15, 2019. Dalakian was in control from the very beginning of the fight, punishing the advancing Sarawut, who offered little in return. He beat Sarawut by a tenth-round technical knockout.

Dalakian vs. Perez 
Dalakian was scheduled to fight Josber Perez in his fourth title defense, on February 8, 2020. Perez was ranked #12 by the WBA at flyweight. Dalakian won the fight by unanimous decision, with scores of 117-111, 117-111 and 118-110. Perez had sporadic success in the first half of the fight, but Dalakian was able to successfully counter with two or three punch combinations.

Dalakian vs. Concepcion 
Dalakian is scheduled to make the fifth defense of his WBA title against Luis Concepción on November 20, 2021, at the AKKO International in Kyiv, Ukraine. Concepcion was ranked #1 by the WBA at flyweight. Dalakian won the fight by a ninth-round technical knockout, forcing Concepción's corner to throw in the towel 41 seconds into the round.

Professional boxing record

See also
List of flyweight boxing champions

References

External links

Artem Dalakian - Profile, News Archive & Current Rankings at Box.Live

1987 births
Living people
Sportspeople from Baku
Ukrainian male boxers
Ukrainian people of Armenian descent
Flyweight boxers
World flyweight boxing champions
World Boxing Association champions